Maraneri is a village in the sivakasi taluk of Virudhunagar district, Tamil Nadu, India.

Demographics 

As per the 2001 census, Maraneri had a total population of 4500 with 873 males and 880 females. The sex ratio was 1008. The literacy rate was 79.22.

References 

 

Villages in Thanjavur district